In Methodism (inclusive of the holiness movement), a tabernacle is the center of a camp meeting, where revival services occur. Tabernacles may be constructed in a cruciform-shaped fashion and are most often made of wood. Like the interior of many Methodist churches, in the center of the tabernacle is an altar upon which the Eucharist is consecrated; a pulpit stands near it and is used by preachers to deliver sermons. The area of the tabernacle housing the altar and pulpit is delimited by the mourner's bench. Surrounding the tabernacle itself are usually several cabins and/or tents, where people stay while attending the camp meeting.

Gallery

See also 

Lovefeast
Tent revival
Second work of grace

References 

Methodism
Holiness movement
Christian architecture